The Rockhaven Sanitarium Historic District is located in the Crescenta Valley at 2713 Honolulu Avenue in what is now the City of Glendale, California. The sanitarium for which it is named was opened in 1923 by psychiatric nurse Agnes Richards as a private mental health institution for women with mild mental and nervous disorders. The property was added to the National Register of Historic Places in June 2016 and in 2021 it was announced that it would be developed into a museum.

Institution
Rockhaven was inspired by principles of the Cottage Plan of Asylum architecture for mental institutions, first developed in the late nineteenth century. The Cottage Plan placed numerous individual buildings within landscaped gardens in order to create a serene, home-like environment for residents.  Rockhaven is one of the best examples of an early twentieth-century woman-owned, women-serving private sanitarium in California, and was one of the first of its type in the nation.  It reflects the vision of founder Agnes Richards, R.N., and represents a small, yet significant movement that sought to improve the conditions of mentally ill women in the early twentieth century.

Agnes Traviss Richards, a registered nurse, was inspired to found her own institution when she became discouraged by the way women with mental illness were treated by large, state-run facilities. Having worked in state-run insane asylums in Nebraska, Iowa and Patton State Hospital in San Bernardino, California, she witnessed the atrocities firsthand.  Richards’ vision was to create a peaceful, home-like setting where women could be cared for surrounded by gardens and lush landscaping.

Building and architecture
Rockhaven Sanitarium Historic District occupies a 3.4-acre site with several vintage hospital wards and guest cottages.  There are a total of fifteen buildings on the property that were erected between 1920 and 1972.  Agnes Richards had some buildings relocated to the Rockhaven Sanitarium and others lifted and turned on their foundation to invite sunlight into the rooms.  Richards acquired the five Craftsman-style buildings over time and she hired Prescott and Brothers to design the Spanish Colonial Revival architecture style structures which were popular in Southern California in the 1920s and 1930s.  Patios and courtyards acted as extensions of the residents’ indoor living quarters inviting privacy and serenity.

Notable residents

Rockhaven Sanitarium became known as the "Screen Actors' Sanitarium", housing starlets and others connected to show business.

Gladys Pearl Baker, mother of actress Marilyn Monroe, lived at Rockhaven from 1952 to 1966. Baker was reported to have escaped from the sanitarium several times; a year after Monroe's death, she received press attention for having walked 15 miles to the Lakeview Terrace Baptist Church.

Billie Burke was a famous Broadway actress and film star who is best known for her role as Glinda the Good Witch in The Wizard of Oz. Burke was a long-time resident of Rockhaven.

Peggy Fears, Broadway actress and legendary Ziegfeld Follies performer-turned-producer who became a real estate financier, died at Rockhaven in August 1994.

Josephine Dillon, famed acting teacher and married at one time to Clark Gable, died at Rockhaven on November 11, 1971 where she had been lovingly cared for during a long illness.

Marion Eleanor Statler Rose, actress best known as the female half of the vaudeville duo Statler & Rose who appeared in technicolor musicals of the time including King of Jazz (1933), entered Rockhaven as a resident in 1994.

Mary Florence Cecilia (Babe) Egan, was the leader of the all-female band The Hollywood Redheads that played throughout the United States, Canada and Europe in the mid-1920s. Egan lived her final years at Rockhaven where she died of a stroke in 1966.

Gwen Lee, a stage and film actress and flapper in silent films of the 1920s.

Closure and current status
Agnes Richards ran Rockhaven Sanitarium until 1967 when she passed it on to her granddaughter Patricia Traviss. In Traviss' time, Rockhaven changed with the needs of its residents and became popular for the care of elderly women with dementia.  In 2001 Traviss sold Rockhaven to a large hospital corporation which operated it as Ararat Home of Los Angeles. However, by 2006 they found the upkeep too costly and sold it to developers who planned to scrap the lot and build condos. The community stepped in to stop the demolition and in 2008 the City of Glendale purchased Rockhaven for about $8.25 million with the intent to open the property to the public for use as a community park.

In February 2016, the site was being considered by the City of Glendale for "adaptive reuse." and later that year, for a mental health facility or a shopping center.". However, in 2019 Glendale cut ties with Gangi Development after two years. In July 2021, they received $8 million in state funds toward turning the site into the Rockhaven Mental Health History Museum at the request of Senator Anthony Portantino (D – La Cañada Flintridge) who proposed that the State of California allocate the money to "the City of Glendale to renovate and preserve the historic Rockhaven property for the public to enjoy and appreciate as a museum."

Historic Designation
The California State Historical Resources Commission gave unanimous approval to list the Rockhaven Sanitarium to the California Register of Historical Resources on April 18, 2016. Despite objection by the City of Glendale, the Friends of Rockhaven successfully nominated the Rockhaven Sanitarium for listing in the National Register of Historic Places and it was so designated in June 2016. It is recognized, in part, for being one of only three women's hospitals remaining from its time.

Friends of Rockhaven
The Friends of Rockhaven is a 501(c)(3) charity organized to protect the buildings and legacy of Rockhaven Sanitarium with the goal of establishing a park and community center.

References

Historic districts on the National Register of Historic Places in California
National Register of Historic Places in Los Angeles County, California
Glendale, California
1923 establishments in California
Psychiatric hospitals in California